Jordan Gobron (born 4 June 1992), is a French professional footballer who plays as a left-back for Béziers.

Professional career
Mendy made his professional debut for Quevilly-Rouen in a Ligue 2 1–1 tie with FC Lorient on 29 July 2017.

In July 2018, Gobron joined Progrès Niederkorn. In April 2019, he was excluded from the squad due to "unprofessional behavior" and his contract was later terminated. In January 2020, he returned to Quevilly-Rouen.

On 5 August 2021, he joined fourth-tier club Béziers.

References

External links
 QRM Profile
 Foot-National Profile
 
 
 

Living people
1992 births
Footballers from Rouen
Association football defenders
French footballers
French expatriate footballers
US Quevilly-Rouen Métropole players
FC Progrès Niederkorn players
Ligue 2 players
Luxembourg National Division players
AS Béziers (2007) players
Championnat National players
Championnat National 2 players
Championnat National 3 players
French expatriate sportspeople in Luxembourg
Expatriate footballers in Luxembourg